The year 1855 in archaeology involved some significant events.

Explorations

Excavations
 May - Heath Wood barrow cemetery in England, by Thomas Bateman.
 Dalton Parlours Roman villa in Yorkshire, England, by F Carroll.

Finds

Events
 December 14 - inaugural meeting of the London and Middlesex Archaeological Society

Publications
 John Yonge Akerman - Remains of Pagan Saxondom.
 Churchill Babington (ed.) - Benefizio della Morte di Cristo, a remarkable book of the Reformation period.

Births
 September 10 - Robert Koldewey, German archaeologist (d. 1925).

Deaths 
 April 15 - William John Bankes, English Member of Parliament, explorer and Egyptologist (b. 1786).

References

In Archaeology, 1855
Archaeology by year
Archaeology
Archaeology